Laurianne Rossi (born 18 May 1984) is a French politician of La République En Marche! (LREM) who was elected to the French National Assembly on 18 June 2017, representing the department of Hauts-de-Seine.

Early life and education
Rossi is a graduate of the Sciences Po Aix (2006) and of the Master 2 "Public Affairs" of the Pantheon-Sorbonne University (2007). During her studies, she completed internships with the Global Fund to Fight AIDS, Tuberculosis and Malaria (GFATM) and the United Nations Development Programme (UNDP).

Political career
From 2007 to 2011, Rossi was a member of the Socialist Party. During that time, she was considered a supporter of Dominique Strauss-Kahn and Pierre Moscovici. She left the party in 2011.

Since joining the National Assembly, Rossi has been serving as quaestor and therefore part of the Assembly's Bureau in the 15th legislature of the French Fifth Republic, under the leadership of president Richard Ferrand. She also serves on the Committee on Sustainable Development and Spatial Planning. In addition to her committee assignments, she is part of the French-Egyptian Parliamentary Friendship Group. 

In September 2018, after François de Rugy's appointment to the government, Rossi supported Barbara Pompili's candidacy for the presidency of the National Assembly.

Other activities
 Observatoire de l'éthique publique (OEP), Vice-President

See also
 2017 French legislative election

References

1984 births
Living people
Deputies of the 15th National Assembly of the French Fifth Republic
La République En Marche! politicians
21st-century French women politicians
French people of Italian descent
Politicians from Toulon
Women members of the National Assembly (France)
Sciences Po Aix alumni
Pantheon-Sorbonne University alumni
Members of Parliament for Hauts-de-Seine